Sam Norton-Knight (born 2 December 1983, in Canberra) is an Australian international rugby union footballer. He was born in Canberra but was educated on the Gold Coast.

Norton-Knight was selected in the under-19 ACT team and subsequently made his provincial debut for the Brumbies against a Fijian side in 2003. He went on to make his Super 12 debut during the 2005 season against the Crusaders. He received a call up to the Australia A squad later that year.

He then signed with the New South Wales Waratahs and made his provincial debut for them in a tour match against a Czech Republic side in Prague, scoring a try on debut for the NSW team. He played in two other matches that tour, against Romanian and Russian teams. He has since been capped 8 times for the Waratahs in Super rugby matches, and following the 2007 Super 14 season, he was called up into the Australian squad.

In March 2009 it was announced he had signed for the Cardiff Blues. After only one season in Wales, it was announced in June 2010 that he had joined the Sanyo Wild Knights in Japan.

External links
Western Force Player Profile
itsrugby.co.uk profile

1983 births
Australian rugby union players
ACT Brumbies players
New South Wales Waratahs players
Western Force players
Living people
Rugby union fly-halves
Cardiff Rugby players
Australia international rugby union players
Saitama Wild Knights players
Kubota Spears Funabashi Tokyo Bay players
Green Rockets Tokatsu players
Expatriate rugby union players in Japan
Australian expatriate rugby union players
Expatriate rugby union players in Wales
Australian expatriate sportspeople in Wales
Australian expatriate sportspeople in Japan
Rugby union players from Canberra